The Alsószentmihály inscription is an inscription on a building stone in Mihai Viteazu, Cluj (Transylvania, today Romania). The origins and translation of the inscription are uncertain.

The relic 

The stone was an ancient Roman building stone—proved by the leaf-symbol, a frequently applied ornamental element of ancient Roman inscriptions—reused in the 10th century. Alsószentmihály located on the territory of the late Province Dacia existed up to the middle of the 3rd century. Dénes showed that the Khavars (Khazar rebels joined the Hungarians in the 9th century) probably settled in this region (that time Transylvania). In some parts of Hungary, there are data of the Khavars even from the 13th century.

Script used for the Alsószentmihály inscription
Some quotations from historian Gábor Vékony about the identification of the script in this inscription:

 "Since the Alsószentmihály inscription was found not in the geographical area of the Old Hungarian script, and in the first line, only vowels could be read based on the Szekely alphabet, we can state surely that the possible transcription of the inscription is surely out of the Székely script".
 "To summarize, we can state that the Alsószentmihály Village inscription is the relic of the Khavars settled into Transylvania, which is naturally written in Khazar with Khazarian script."
 "Similar symbol occurs in other Khazarian runic inscriptions as well."
 "In Transylvania, the inscription of the reused stone built into the wall of the church of the Alsószentmihály Village is unambiguously written with Khazarian runic alphabet."

Based on the quotations above examples, it can be stated that Vékony identified the script of the Alsószentmihály relic as a Khazarian script. According to Vékony, another relic, namely the Homokmégy-Halom inscription contains Khazarian text as well.

The meaning of the inscription 

The Alsószentmihály inscription was deciphered by archaeologist Gábor Vékony.

The transcription of Vékony (it uses IPA symbols):

According to Vékony, the inscription was made by a Khavar leader, whose religion was Karaite. The first symbol of the first row is a ligature, its transcription: atlïɣ. The first symbol (from left) in the second row is a Khazarian word separator.

In the inscription, the third symbol of the first row (from left), and the symbol in the second and last place can be considered as the descendants of the Turkic ideograms. Nevertheless, their relation needs more evidence.

Critics, alternative theories
There are several critics of Vékony's theories and translations, most notably the Hungarian linguist and historian, András Róna-Tas. The debates were summarized by István Riba in 1999 and 2000.

Notes

External links 
 The Alsószentmihályfalva Rovas inscription on the RovasPedia
 Jenő Demeczky, Dr. Gábor Hosszú, Tamás Rumi, László Sípos, Dr. Erzsébet Zelliger: Revised proposal for encoding the Rovas in the UCS. Individual Contribution for consideration by UTC and ISO/IEC JTC1/SC2/WG2, 14. October 2012.
 Rovás Info News Portal
 Rovas Foundation: Code request for the Rovas script in ISO 15924 (2012-10-20)
 Jenő Demeczky, György Giczi, Dr. Gábor Hosszú, Gergely Kliha, Dr. Borbála Obrusánszky, Tamás Rumi, László Sípos, Dr. Erzsébet Zelliger: Additional information about the name of the Rovas script. Individual Contribution for consideration by UTC and ISO/IEC JTC1/SC2/WG2, 2012-10-21.
 Jenő Demeczky, György Giczi, Gábor Hosszú, Gergely Kliha, Borbála Obrusánszky, Tamás Rumi, László Sípos, Erzsébet Zelliger: About the consensus of the Rovas encoding – Response to N4373 (Resolutions of the 8th Hungarian World Congress on the encoding of Old Hungarian). Individual Contribution for consideration by UTC and ISO/IEC JTC1/SC2/WG2. Registered by UTC (L2/12-337), 2012-10-24

References
 Bálint, Csanád (1980): Some Archaeological Addenda to P. Golden's Khazar Studies. In: Acta Orientalia Academiae Scientiarium Hungaricae Vol. 34. 1981, pp. 397–412
 Bálint, Csanád (1981): A kazár kaganátus régészeti kutatása a Szovjetunióban [The archaeological research of the Khazar Khanate in the Soviet Union]. In: Magyar Tudomány [Hungarian Science], No. 5. 1980, pp. 381–386
 Benkő, Elek (1972): Egy újabb rovásírásos emlék Erdélyből [A new runic script relic from Transsylvania]. (A szentmihályfalvi templom rovásfelirata [The runic inscription of the Alsószentmihály church]). In: Magyar Nyelv [Hungarian Language]. 1972, Vol. LXVIII, No. 4, pp. 453 and Appendix
 Dénes, József (1984–1985): A magyarok hét neme és hét országa (A magyar "törzsek" elhelyezkedése a Kárpát-medencében") [The seven gens and seven countries of the Magyars (The allocation of the Magyar "tribes" in the Carpathian Basin)]. In: Móra Ferenc Múzeum Évkönyve [The Annual of the Ferenc Móra Museum of Szeged], Szeged, 1991, pp. 571–577
 Györffy, György (1990): A magyarság keleti elemei. [The Eastern Elements of the Hungarians]. Budapest: Gondolat. 
 Kristó, Gyula & Makk, Ferenc (2001): A kilencedik és a tizedik század története [The history of the 9th and the 10th centuries]. In: Magyar Századok [Hungarian Centuries]. Published by Pannonica Kiadó, Ser. ed.: Gyula Szvák, 222 p. 
 Róna-Tas, András (1999): The Khazars and the Magyars. In: Golden, Ben-Shammai, and Róna-Tas (eds., 1999), pp. 269–278
 Róna-Tas, András (2007): Tudtak-e írni a magyarok a honfoglalás előtt? Írásbeliség Eurázsiában, 7–9. század [Could the Hungarians write before the Magyars' Landtaking? Literacy in Eurasia, 7th–9th centuries], In: História, Vol. 29, No. 8, pp. 22–24
 Vékony, Gábor (1985): Késő népvándorláskori rovásfeliratok [Runic inscriptions from the Late Migration Period]. In: Életünk Vol. XXII, No. 1, pp. 71–84
 Vékony, Gábor (1987): Későnépvándorláskori rovásfeliratok a Kárpát-medencében [Runic inscriptions from the Late Migration Period in the Carpathian Basin]. Szombathely-Budapest: Életünk szerkesztősége. 
 Vékony, Gábor (2004): A székely írás emlékei, kapcsolatai, története. Budapest: Nap Kiadó. 

Extinct languages of Europe
History of the Hungarians
Inscriptions of disputed origin
Karaite Judaism
Rovas script
Turkic inscriptions
Writing systems